McCreary is a surname.

McCreary may refer to:

Places
McCreary County, Kentucky
McCreary County Airport
United States Penitentiary, McCreary, a high-security federal prison
Rural Municipality of McCreary, Manitoba, Canada
McCreary, Manitoba, a village
McCreary Airport
McCrearys, a community within the town of Mississippi Mills, Ontario, Canada

Other
McCreary Tire Company, a racing tire brand that is known for dirt track racing and also earning one pole in the NASCAR Sprint Cup Series

See also
McCreery